The Koukdjuak River begins at the outlet of Nettilling Lake and empties into the Arctic Ocean. It is the namesake of the Great Plain of the Koukdjuak located in the Foxe Basin on western Baffin Island, Nunavut (formerly Northwest Territories), northern Canada.

The first non-Inuit who specifically explored the river was the Canadian Arctic explorer/ornithologist, J. Dewey Soper. The northern boundary of the Dewey Soper Migratory Bird Sanctuary is the middle thread of the Koukdjuak River. The river is also notable as a Barren-ground caribou migration crossing and for Arctic charr fishing.

See also
List of rivers of Nunavut

References

Further reading
 Kraft, Paul G. Caribou Tagging on the Koukdjuak River, Baffin Island, N.W.T. A Summary and Analysis of Tag Returns. Yellowknife: N.W.T. Wildlife Service, 1984. 
 Kristofferson, A. H., R. D. Sopuck, and D. K. McGowan. Commercial Fishing Potential for Searun Arctic Charr, Koukdjuak River and Nettilling Lake, Northwest Territories. Canadian manuscript report of fisheries and aquatic sciences, no. 2120. Winnipeg: Fisheries and Oceans Canada, 1991.

Bodies of water of Baffin Island
Rivers of Qikiqtaaluk Region